Jaak Kärner (22 March 1892 – 22 July 1937) was an Estonian sport shooter.

He was born in Tartu.

He participated in World War I and the Estonian War of Independence.

He won three medals at ISSF World Shooting Championships. 1932–1936 he was a member of Estonian national sport shooting team.

He is buried at Paistu Cemetery.

References

1892 births
1937 deaths
Estonian male sport shooters
Estonian military personnel of World War I
Estonian military personnel of the Estonian War of Independence
Sportspeople from Tartu